WS-Policy4MASC is a policy language for managing Web services and their composition.

Overview 
WS-Policy4MASC extends a widely used industrial standard, WS-Policy, with information necessary for run-time management, including the unique support for autonomic business-driven IT management (BDIM). The specifications of diverse financial and non-financial business value metrics and business strategies that guide business-value driven selection among alternative control (adaptation) actions are the main distinctive characteristics and contributions of WS-Policy4MASC. WS-Policy4MASC also supports other management aspects, such as fault management and maximization of technical QoS metrics. It has built-in constructs for specification of a wide range of adaptations and events common in management of service-oriented systems and business processes they implement.

References
[1] Tosic, V., Erradi, A., & Maheshwari, P. (2007). WS-Policy4MASC - A WS-Policy extension used in the Manageable and Adaptable Service Compositions (MASC) middleware. In van der Aalst, W.M.P., L.-J. Zhang, & P.C.K. Hung (Eds.), Proceedings of SCC 2007 (pp. 458–465). Los Alamitos, USA: IEEE-CS Press.

Web service specifications